A Line in the Sand is a 1992 computer wargame for MS-DOS developed and published by Strategic Simulations. It is based on the A Line in the Sand board game.

Gameplay
A Line in the Sand is a computer game translation of the board game A Line in the Sand.

Reception

The reviewer from Computer Gaming World stated: "Line is a 'beer-and-pretzels' game - or more appropriately, since alcohol is forbidden in most of the Arab world, it is a 'pretzels' game. Light entertainment that, like 'non-alcoholic' beer, simply lacks the gestalt of reality." In a 1994 survey of wargames the magazine gave the title two-plus stars out of five, stating that it "is not an accurate representation of the Gulf War" but that the other scenarios were "more interesting".

References

External links

Review in PC World

1992 video games
Computer wargames
DOS games
DOS-only games
Strategic Simulations games
Video games based on board games
Video games developed in the United States